Music in a Doll's House is the debut album by English progressive rock group Family, released on 19 July 1968. The album, co-produced by Dave Mason of Traffic, features a number of complex musical arrangements contributing to its ambitious psychedelic sound.

Background
The Beatles had originally intended to use the title A Doll's House for the double album they were recording during 1968. The release of Family's similarly titled debut then prompted them to adopt the minimalist title The Beatles for what is now commonly referred to as the "White Album" due to its plain white sleeve.

"Old Songs, New Songs" features a cameo from the Tubby Hayes group, arranged by 18-year-old Mike Batt. Hayes played the tenor sax solo at the end of the track (uncredited). Batt also arranged and conducted other strings and brass for the album, notably "The Chase" and "Mellowing Grey" but was not credited.

The album was the first of its kind by an English rock group on the US Reprise label set up for Frank Sinatra (but was already part of Warner Bros). It was licensed to the label by Dukeslodge Enterprises, a company run by the band's manager, John Gilbert, who was credited as 'executive producer' of the album. The album was released on vinyl in mono (RLP6312) and stereo (RSLP6312), and also Stereo 8 Track Cartridge. Mono vinyl copies featured a different mix to the stereo pressing and many mono copies were returned to the shops as they often skipped tracks. The mono edition was swiftly withdrawn, making this a much sought-after format.

This album was initially issued in the US using the UK import and sold in the US as a domestic album with an extra piece of cardboard to stiffen the sleeve (as they essentially had the same catalog number in both countries).  Around the time the second album was issued in the US, US pressings of this album started to appear.  (The album also initially had a 12" black and white photo of group included as an insert.)

In the Q & Mojo Classic Special Edition Pink Floyd & The Story of Prog Rock, the album ranked number 30 in its list of "40 Cosmic Rock Albums".
It was voted number 606 in the third edition of Colin Larkin's All Time Top 1000 Albums (2000).

Track listing
All tracks written by John Whitney and Roger Chapman, except as noted.

Personnel

Family
 Roger Chapman – vocals, harmonica, tenor saxophone
 John "Charlie" Whitney – lead and steel guitars
 Jim King – tenor and soprano saxophones, vocals, harmonica
 Ric Grech – bass guitar, vocals, violin, cello
 Rob Townsend – drums, percussion

Technical
 Dave Mason – producer, Mellotron
 Jimmy Miller – co-producer on "The Breeze" and "Peace of Mind"
 John Gilbert – executive producer
 Eddie Kramer – engineer
 George Chkiantz – second engineer
 Peter Duval – album design
 Julian Cottrell – front cover photography
 Jac Remise – back cover photography

References 

Sleevenotes from CD re-release of album on See For Miles Records

Notes

Family (band) albums
1968 debut albums
Albums produced by Dave Mason
Albums produced by Jimmy Miller
Reprise Records albums